Mascarita is a given name. Notable people with the name include:

Mascarita Divina (born 1983), the ring name of a Mexican Luchador enmascarado, or masked professional wrestler
Mascarita Dorada (born 1982), the ring name of a Mexican Luchador enmascarado, or masked professional wrestler
Mascarita Magica or Fire (wrestler) (born 1973), Mexican luchador, or professional wrestler
Mascarita Sagrada (born 1965), Mexican Mini Luchador enmascarado (Spanish for Midget Masked wrestler)
Mascarita Sagrada (2007), Mexican Luchador enmascarado, or masked professional wrestler

See also
Macaravita
Masaki Orita
Mascara
Mascarenhia